Lowin is a surname. Notable people with the surname include:

Heinz Lowin (1938–1987), German footballer
John Lowin (1576–1653), English actor

See also
 Lewin
 Lovin
 Lowing
 Łowin (disambiguation)

Surnames of Old English origin